No Sad Songs for Me is a 1950 film directed by Rudolph Maté, featuring Margaret Sullavan in her last film role as a woman dying of cancer. It was nominated for an Academy Award for Best Music Scoring in 1951. The sentimental film is known as a post-war Hollywood tearjerker.

Synopsis
Mary Scott thought she was pregnant. Instead she learns from her physician she has terminal cancer with only eight months to live. She gets the doctor's assurance to keep her illness a secret and not tell her husband Bradley and young daughter Polly. She wants to live her last year with each minute happy and important. Brad is a surveyor. and Mary is a wife, mother and housekeeper. Husband gets a new assistant at work. Chris Radna is a draftsman and much help to the business.

Christmas is coming, and Polly's joy at Christmas is evident. Mary keeps trying to do each thing just right. For New Year's Eve, Mary insists they invite Chris to the annual party. Brad sees Chris in a dress for the first time, and he flirts and dances with her all night. Husband Brad is paying so much attention that Mary hears the other women gossiping about it in the ladies' room. Mary is sure her ultimate sacrifice of secrecy is protecting her family, but she is still hurt.

It becomes clear that Brad and Chris are falling in love and to get away, Mary visits her father in San Francisco. Still she cannot tell her dad about the cancer. She comes home and decides if her husband no longer loves her that suicide may be the answer. Brad really does love his wife, he tells her of the affair, and he expresses remorse. It is over, and Chris is leaving town. Mary secretly visits Chris, and Chris is sorry too. Chris's first husband died in World War II, and she never expected to see love gain.

Mary sees that Brad and Chris were compatible and even sees that Chris and Polly got along so well. She convinces Chris to stay. She likes Chris and thinks she would be a good wife. Mary then goes about grooming everyone to know what to do when she was no longer with them. She allows Chris and Polly to get close. Because she loves her family, she wants to make her death and their lives as easy as possible. One day Brad finds Mary's pain pills, and he calls the doctor. Keeping the secret, Brad tries to make Mary's last weeks as wonderful as he can. They even take an idyllic vacation to Mexico. The final scene shows Polly and Chris at the piano, and Brad calls Chris from Mexico to inform her about Mary's death.

Cast

References

External links

1950 films
1950 drama films
American black-and-white films
American drama films
Columbia Pictures films
Films scored by George Duning
Films about cancer
Films directed by Rudolph Maté
1950s English-language films
1950s American films